Events in the year 1864 in Iceland.

Incumbents 

 Monarch: Christian IX
 Council President of Denmark:Ditlev Gothard Monrad (until 11 July); Christian Albrecht Bluhme onwards.

Births 

 October 31 − Einar Benediktsson, poet.

References 

 
1860s in Iceland
Years of the 19th century in Iceland
Iceland
Iceland